The Sundaic mountain leopoldamys (Leopoldamys ciliatus) is a species of rodent from the family Muridae. It was formerly considered a subspecies of Edwards's long-tailed giant rat, and it has one synonym: Leopoldamys setiger.

The Sundaic mountain leopoldamys occurs in the montane forests of Sumatra, Indonesia, and peninsular Malaysia, typically at elevations above . It is a terrestrial, possibly arboreal species occurring in primary and degraded tropical moist forest.

The Sundaic mountain leopoldamys is listed as Least Concern by the IUCN Red List due to a wide distribution, presumed large population, occurrence in a number of protected areas, degree of tolerance for habitat modification, and unlikely declination at the speed to qualify for a more threatened listing. However, due to deforestation of its habitat for timber, firewood, and agricultural land, its population is decreasing.

References 

Mammals described in 1900
Leopoldamys
Taxa named by J. Lewis Bonhote